Sarah Hoare (1777–1856) was a British author and artist known for her scientific poetry.

Biography
Hoare was born on 7 July 1777 in Old Broad Street in the parish of St Peter le Poer, London to Samuel and Sarah (née Gurney) Hoare.

In 1831, she wrote and illustrated Poems on Conchology and Botany.  Hoare's book is an early example of a female Victorian author using observations and scientifically based research to inform her writing. Hoare's poems are a rare example of a collection based on conchology. It has been argued that Hoare and her contemporaries were influenced by the writings of Erasmus Darwin and in particular by his poem The Loves of Plants. 

Hoare was also an artist. The National Portrait Gallery holds a portrait of her father Samuel Hoare based on an original work by her.

She died in Bath in 1856. Hoare wrote a memoir of her father's life which was published posthumously in 1911.

Bibliography
 A poem on the pleasures and advantages of botanical pursuits (1826)
 The brother, or, A few poems intended for the instruction of very young persons (1827) 
 Poems on Conchology and Botany (1831)
 Memoirs of Samuel Hoare by his daughter Sarah and his widow Hannah (1911)

References

1777 births
1856 deaths
Botanical illustrators
British biographers
19th-century British women writers
19th-century British writers
British illustrators
British women poets
Writers from Bristol
19th-century British women artists
19th-century British poets
Women biographers